Nicholas  Albert (born c. 1918) was a Canadian football guard who played for the Edmonton Eskimos of the Canadian Football League in 1949. He played in four regular season games.

References 

1910s births
1985 deaths
Tulsa Golden Hurricane football players
Edmonton Elks players
American football guards
Canadian football guards
American emigrants to Canada